Someplace Closer To Here is the debut studio album by American rock band Lapush. It was released on June 7, 2005 through 456 and Fontana/Universal.

Track listing

References

2005 debut albums
Lapush albums